Warm and Tender may refer to:

Warm and Tender (Olivia Newton-John album), a 1989 album by Olivia Newton-John
Warm and Tender, US title of The Song of My Life, an album by Petula Clark
Warm and Tender, an album by Charlie Watts